Apothecary to the Household at Sandringham is an officer of the Medical Household of the Royal Household of the Sovereign of the United Kingdom. He is paid a small salary.

List of apothecaries 
 Alan Reeve Manby MVO, MD 1901
 Sir Frederic Jeune Williams KCVO MRCS LRCP 1924–1949
 JLB Ansell MVO MRCS LRCP c.1953 – c.1964
 Hugh Ford CVO MB BS FRCGP DObst RCOG c.1967 – c.1991
 Ian Campbell LVO MB BS FRCGP c.1992–2007

References

Further reading 
 

Positions within the British Royal Household